Panchbibi is an upazila of Joypurhat District in the Division of Rajshahi, Bangladesh.

Geography
It has 38,555 household units and a total area of 278.53 km2.

Panchbibi Upazila is bounded by Hakimpur and Ghoraghat Upazilas in Dinajpur district, and Hili CD Block in Dakshin Dinajpur district, West Bengal, India, on the north, Gobindaganj Upazila in Gaibandha District and Kalai Upazila in Joypurhat District on the east, Joypurhat Sadar Upazila on the south and  Joypurhat Sadar Upazila and Balurghat CD Block in Dakshin Dinajpur district, West Bengal, India, on the west.

Demographics
According to the 2001 Bangladesh census, Population of the upazila was: Total 215806; male 110588, female 105218; Muslim 183355, Hindu 23925, Buddhist 3451, Christian 81 and others 4994. Indigenous communities such as santal, munda and oraon belong to this upazila.

As of the 1991 Bangladesh census, Panchbibi has a population of 193,365. Males constitute 51.06% of the population, and females 48.94%. This Upazila's population of people aged eighteen and higher is 99,108. Panchbibi has an average literacy rate of 30.6% (7+ years), against the national average of 32.4% literate.

Administration
Panchbibi Thana, now an upazila, was formed in 1868.

Panchbibi Upazila is divided into Panchbibi Municipality and eight union parishads: Aolai, Atapur, Aymarasulpur, Bagjana, Balighata, Dharanji, Kusumba, and Mohammadpur. The union parishads are subdivided into 222 mauzas and 247 villages.

Panchbibi Municipality is subdivided into 9 wards and 14 mahallas.

See also
Upazilas of Bangladesh
Districts of Bangladesh
Divisions of Bangladesh

References

Upazilas of Joypurhat District